Rajya Sabha elections were held throughout 2022, to elect the retiring members of the Rajya Sabha, the Indian Parliament's upper house.

Elections to the 4 vacant seats from Jammu and Kashmir were not held in February as the union territory is under President's rule and the assembly has been dissolved.

List of elections by states

Listed according to the dates

Results

Members retiring and elected
Note:
 Listed according to date of retirement

Assam

Himachal Pradesh

Kerala

Nagaland

Tripura

Punjab

Andhra Pradesh

Telangana

Chhattisgarh

Madhya Pradesh

Tamil Nadu

Karnataka

Odisha

Maharashtra

Rajasthan

Uttar Pradesh

Uttarakhand

Bihar

Jharkhand

Haryana

By-elections
Aside from automatic elections, unforeseen vacancies caused by members' resignation, death or disqualification, are unless a few months before the expected natural expiry of the term of tenure, filled via by-elections, which for the Rajya Sabha often take some months to organise.

Bihar

 On 26 December 2021, Mahendra Prasad died

Telangana

 On 4 December 2021, Banda Prakash resigned

Odisha

 On 27 April 2022, Subhash Chandra Singh was elected the Mayor of Cuttack.

Tripura

 On 26 June 2022 Manik Saha was elected to the Tripura Legislative Assembly.

Nominations

Nominated members

See also 

 2022 elections in India
 List of current members of the Rajya Sabha

Notes

References

 
2022